A star is a massive luminous spheroid astronomical object made of plasma that is held together by its own gravity. Stars exhibit great diversity in their properties (such as mass, volume, velocity, stage in stellar evolution, and distance from Earth) and some of the outliers are so disproportionate in comparison with the general population that they are considered extreme. This is a list of such stars.

Records that are regarded as authoritative and unlikely to change at any given point are recorded on a white background, while those that could change with new information and/or discoveries are recorded on a grey background.

Age and distance

Brightness and power

Size and mass

Motion

Star systems

See also

Notes

References

External links
25 Brightest Stars, as Seen from the Earth
The Brightest Stars at An Atlas of the Universe
The Magnitude system
About stellar magnitudes

Extremes
Star extremes